The 2014–15 Georgia Lady Bulldogs women's basketball team represented University of Georgia in the 2014–15 college basketball season. The Lady Bulldogs, led by thirty-sixth and final year head coach Andy Landers. The team plays their home games at Stegeman Coliseum and were members of the Southeastern Conference. They finished the season 19–12, 6–10 in SEC play to finish in a tie for ninth place. They advanced to the quarterfinals of the SEC women's tournament where they lost to Tennessee. They missed the postseason tournament for the first time since 1994.

Roster

Schedule

|-
!colspan=12 style="background:#000000; color:#A0000B;"| Non-Conference Regular Season

|-
!colspan=12 style="background:#000000; color:#A0000B;"| SEC Regular Season

|-
!colspan=12 style="background:#000000; color:#A0000B;"| SEC Women's Tournament

Rankings

See also
2014–15 Georgia Bulldogs basketball team

References

Georgia
Georgia Lady Bulldogs basketball seasons
Bulldogs
Bulldogs